Seignelay may refer to:

 Seignelay, commune in the Yonne department in Bourgogne-Franche-Comté in north-central France
 Jean-Baptiste Colbert, Marquis de Seignelay (1651–1690), French politician
 Seignelay River, river of the Côte-Nord region of Quebec, Canada
 Seignelay River, former name of the Kankakee River in Illinois, United States